Queery is an American podcast created and hosted by comedian Cameron Esposito. As the name suggests, the podcast is centered around queerness—the facets of the LGBTQ experience—and self-identifying queer guests. Guests range from widely known public figures such as Olympic figure-skater Adam Rippon, and musician sisters Tegan & Sara, to more niche-group individuals such as Irish singer-songwriter SOAK, animator and Steven Universe creator Rebecca Sugar, and comedian-writer Travon Free.

Background
Esposito's stated intention with starting Queery surrounded the identity politics that shape the LGBTQ+ landscape. In a Billboard interview about the podcast and her other ventures, Esposito said the show is about "reinvesting in the queer community in a way that I don't think I let myself before." In her show's preface, Esposito states that the show is "about individual experience and personal identity." She echoes the thesis in an Amy Poehler's Smart Girls interview.
The show is produced by the Earwolf Network and engineered by Jordan Duffy.

Awards and nominations
 In September 2018, Queery was named as one of Medium's "Podcasts We Love."
In late 2019, Queery was placed on the eligibility list for nomination as a Podcast Awards 2020 winner.
In November 2019, Queery was categorized as one of the "best LGBT podcasts" by Player.fm.

Episodes

See also 
 List of LGBT podcasts

References

LGBT-related podcasts
Earwolf